is Rythem's fourteenth (fifteenth overall) single. It was released on February 20, 2008 under the Sony Music Entertainment Japan label. The title track was used as the theme song for Nikkatsu Co. Ltd.'s film entitled Naoko. Aishikata was used as the campaign song for Nippon Travel Agency Co., Ltd.'s Akai Fuusen Sotsugyou Ryoukou. While Nekoze (acoustic version) was used as the theme song for Nippon TV's  Shiawase no Shokutaku.

This single contains a limited and regular edition and these two editions have different track listing. The item's stock number is AICL-1916.

Limited edition track listing
Kubisuji Line
Composition/Lyrics: Yui Nītsu
Arrangement: Shin Kouno
Aishikata
Composition/Lyrics: Yui Nītsu
Arrangement: Shin Kouno
Nekoze (acoustic version)
Composition/Lyrics: Yui Nītsu
Arrangement: Yuuta Saitou

Regular edition track listing
Kubisuji Line
Aishikata
Kubisuji Line (acoustic version)
Kubisuji Line (Minus YUI vocal)
Kubisuji Line (Minus YUKA vocal)

Charts and sales

2008 singles
Rythem songs
Japanese film songs
2008 songs